Desperate Riders is an American western film, which was released in 2022.

Plot
Tom Berenger stars in the western thriller, Desperate Riders. It centers on Victoria Pratt, who plays a kidknapped woman. Trace Adkins plays the kidknapper, but its unsure if she needs rescuing.

Cast 

 Drew Waters as Kansas Red
 Vanessa Evigan as Leslie
 Sam Ashby as Billy
 Victoria Pratt as Carol
 Cowboy Troy as Finnegan
 Rob Mayes as Deputy Harms
 Trace Adkins as Thorn
 Tom Berenger as Doc Tillman

Production
The film was directed by Michael Feifer and produced by Milestone Studios.

Filming 
Desperate Riders was filmed exclusively in the state of Tennessee in 2021.  Filming locations included Historic Collinsville, Rippavilla Plantation, and Beech Grove.  Middle Tennessee was chosen for its scenery and access to country music stars.

Release 
The film was released in 2022 and was distributed by Lionsgate.  It was released in theaters and via streaming simultaneously.

References

External links 

2022 films
American Western (genre) films
Films shot in Tennessee